The Mobile Seagulls were a professional indoor football team. They were initially a member of the Indoor Professional Football League for the 2000 season before joining the National Indoor Football League for the 2001 season, their final. They played their home games at Mobile Civic Center Arena for the 2000 season and at the Mitchell Center for the 2001 season. The majority owner of the team was Mobile businessman, James Childers.

The Seagulls were announced as an expansion franchise as part of the IPFL on February 10, 2000. It was during this press conference that former Houston Oilers receiver Kenny Burrough was announced as the team's general manager and head coach. The 2001 season saw former New Orleans Saints QB, John Fourcade take over as head coach and quarterback.

2000 Mobile Seagulls IPFL Schedule 
Week 1 – Mobile Seagulls 33, at Mississippi Fire Dogs 57

Week 2 – Mobile Seagulls 29, at Louisiana Rangers 43

Week 3 – bye

Week 4 – Mississippi Fire Dogs 23, at Mobile Seagulls 30

Week 5 – Portland Prowlers 12, at Mobile Seagulls 19

Week 6 – Omaha Beef 39, at Mobile Seagulls 36

Week 7 – bye

Week 8 – Louisiana Rangers 32, at Mobile Seagulls 3

Week 9 – Mobile Seagulls 31, at Shreveport-Bossier Bombers 34

Week 10 – Shreveport-Bossier Bombers 27, at Mobile Seagulls 15

Week 11 – Mobile Seagulls 40, at Mississippi Fire Dogs 30

Week 12 – Mississippi Fire Dogs 30, at Mobile Seagulls 16

Week 13 – Mobile Seagulls 57, at Portland Prowlers 41

Week 14 – Mobile Seagulls 55, at Shreveport-Bossier Bombers 51

Week 15 – Louisiana Rangers 13, at Mobile Seagulls 21

Week 16 – Mobile Seagulls 44, at Omaha Beef 57

Week 17 – Idaho Stallions 7, at Mobile Seagulls 63

Week 18 – Mobile Seagulls 51, at Idaho Stallions 34

Week 19 – bye

Season-By-Season 

|-
| colspan="6" align="center" | Mobile Seagulls (IPFL)
|-
|2000 || 8 || 8 || 0 || 4th League || --
|-
| colspan="6" align="center" | Mobile Seagulls (NIFL)
|-
|2001 || 5 || 7 || 0 || 4th Southern || --
|-
!Totals || 13 || 15 || 0
|colspan="2"| (including playoffs)

References

Sports in Mobile, Alabama
National Indoor Football League teams
Indoor Professional Football League teams
American football teams in Alabama
American football teams established in 2000
American football teams disestablished in 2001
2000 establishments in Alabama
2001 disestablishments in Alabama